The Ngome dwarf chameleon  (Bradypodion ngomeense) is a species of chameleon found in South Africa.

References

Bradypodion
Reptiles of South Africa
Reptiles described in 2009
Taxa named by Colin R. Tilbury
Taxa named by Krystal A. Tolley